Chal Abza (also Romanized as Chāl Ābzā; also known as Chāl Ābzār) is a village in Susan-e Sharqi Rural District, Susan District, Izeh County, Khuzestan Province, Iran. At the 2006 census, its population was 417, in 71 families.

References 

Populated places in Izeh County